Cyclocheilon is a genus of flowering plants belonging to the family Orobanchaceae.

Its native range is Northeastern Tropical Africa, Southwestern Arabian Peninsula.

Species:

Cyclocheilon kelleri 
Cyclocheilon physocalyx 
Cyclocheilon somaliense

References

Orobanchaceae
Orobanchaceae genera